Crozets de Savoie are small, square-shaped, flat pasta originally made in the Savoie region in southeast France. Crozets were made traditionally at home by housewives using buckwheat or wheat, or sometimes both. This pasta is used mainly to prepare two regional dishes, the croziflette (a variant of tartiflette) and crozets with diots.

History
The name Crozet would have been modeled on the term croseti which designates a form of Italian pasta.

See also
 Hilopites
 Lazanki
 List of buckwheat dishes
 List of pasta
 List of pasta dishes

References

Cuisine of Auvergne-Rhône-Alpes
Buckwheat dishes